The Minister for Building and Construction is a minister in the government of New Zealand with responsibility for the government's building, construction and housing programmes. The position was established in 2004 as the Minister for Building Issues.

The present Minister is Megan Woods, a member of the Labour Party.

Responsibilities and powers 
The minister's responsibilities include the regulation of the building and construction sector, including setting the performance requirements for buildings and building products. The portfolio is administered by the Ministry of Business, Innovation and Employment.

The primary legislation for the portfolio is the Building Act 2004, which sets out the rules for the construction, alteration, demolition and maintenance of new and existing buildings in New Zealand. The minister also oversees the regulation of engineers, plumbers, gasfitters, drainlayers and architects.

History
In 2004, following its 2003 review of the housing sector amid the leaky homes crisis, the Fifth Labour Government announced plans to reconfigure government services related to building and housing. A new Department of Building and Housing was created by disestablishing the existing Ministry of Housing and transferring relevant functions from the Ministry of Economic Development, Department of Internal Affairs and Ministry of Social Development. The new agency was to report to two Ministers: the Minister of Housing (an existing role) and the new Minister of Building Issues. 

It had been suggested that John Tamihere, an Associate Minister of Commerce who had overseen the passage of the Building Act 2004, would be named Building Minister; however, he resigned from Cabinet in October 2004 and Commerce Minister Margaret Wilson was named the inaugural Minister of Building Issues instead.

The portfolio was renamed Minister of Building and Construction in 2007. In 2014, it was amalgamated with the housing portfolio (as Minister of Building and Housing); this was reversed in 2016 with housing responsibility now sitting with the Minister for Social Housing.

List of Ministers
Key

Table footnotes:

References

Building and Construction
Public housing
Housing in New Zealand